Captain John Joseph Cowan CSC, CD (born 23 July 1957) is a Royal Australian Navy (RAN) officer. Cowan originally joined the Royal Canadian Navy (RCN) in 1976 as an ordinary seaman boatswain, eventually being commissioned as an officer in 1988, but transferred to the RAN in 1996.

Early life
Cowan was born on 23 July 1957 in Penticton, British Columbia. He joined the Navy League Cadet Corps in his youth and, at age 13, transferred to the Royal Canadian Sea Cadets (RCSC). During his time in the RCSC he spent time onboard CCGS Quadra and later HMC Ship's Terra Nova and Yukon.

Service history

Royal Canadian Navy
John joined the Royal Canadian Navy as an ordinary seaman boatswain in 1976. He is qualified as a surface warfare specialist. He was deployed as part of the Canadian response and support to Operation Sharp Guard for the blockade of the former Yugoslavia. He qualified as a navigator during his seaman officer training course.

He spent the majority of his career as sea serving mainly with the Maritime Forces Pacific. He retired from the Royal Canadian Navy on 7 July 1996 after 13 years service.

Royal Australian Navy
John joined the Royal Australian Navy on 8 July 1996, retaining his commission and qualification as a ships navigator. He served as the navigator onboard HMA Ship's Brisbane and Tobruk.

References

External links
 RAN Biography

1957 births
Living people
People from Penticton
Recipients of the Conspicuous Service Cross (Australia)